General elections were held in Sweden in 1869 to elect the Second Chamber of the Riksdag for a three-year term. In urban areas the elections were direct, whilst in some rural areas the vote was indirect, using electors.

Electoral system
Suffrage was given to men over the age of 21 who either had a taxable income of at least 800 riksdaler a year, owned a property worth at least 1,000 riksdaler, or rented a property taxed to at least 6,000 riksdaler.

The Second Chamber had one representative from every Domsaga (or two for Domsaga with a population over 40,000) and one representative for every 10,000 residents of a town (with smaller towns merged into combined constituencies). Candidates were required to be at least 25 years old.

References

1869 elections in Europe
1869 in Sweden
1869